= MicroRNA 320b-2 =

Non-coding RNA in the species Homo sapiens

MIR320B2

Identifiers
- Aliases: MIR320B2, MIR320B-2, MIRN320B2, mir-320b-2, microRNA 320b-2
- External IDs: GeneCards: MIR320B2; OMA:MIR320B2 - orthologs
Orthologs
Species	Human	Mouse
Entrez	100313769	n/a
Ensembl	ENSG00000221406	n/a
UniProt	n a	n/a
RefSeq (mRNA)	n/a	n/a
RefSeq (protein)	n/a	n/a
Location (UCSC)	n/a	n/a
PubMed search		n/a
- Wikidata
View/Edit Human

MicroRNA 320b-2 is a protein that in humans is encoded by the MIR320B2 gene.

== Function ==
microRNAs (miRNAs) are short (20-24 nt) non-coding RNAs that are involved in post-transcriptional regulation of gene expression in multicellular organisms by affecting both the stability and translation of mRNAs. miRNAs are transcribed by RNA polymerase II as part of capped and polyadenylated primary transcripts (pri-miRNAs) that can be either protein-coding or non-coding. The primary transcript is cleaved by the Drosha ribonuclease III enzyme to produce an approximately 70-nt stem-loop precursor miRNA (pre-miRNA), which is further cleaved by the cytoplasmic Dicer ribonuclease to generate the mature miRNA and antisense miRNA star (miRNA*) products. The mature miRNA is incorporated into a RNA-induced silencing complex (RISC), which recognizes target mRNAs through imperfect base pairing with the miRNA and most commonly results in translational inhibition or destabilization of the target mRNA. The RefSeq represents the predicted microRNA stem-loop.
